The 1926 VFL season was the 30th season of the Victorian Football League (VFL), the highest level senior Australian rules football competition in Victoria. The season featured twelve clubs, ran from 1 May until 9 October, and comprised an 18-game home-and-away season followed by a finals series featuring the top four clubs.

The premiership was won by the Melbourne Football Club for the second time, after it defeated  by 57 points in the 1926 VFL Grand Final.

Premiership season
In 1926, the VFL competition consisted of twelve teams of 18 on-the-field players each, with no "reserves", although any of the 18 players who had left the playing field for any reason could later resume their place on the field at any time during the match.

Teams played each other in a home-and-away season of 18 rounds; matches 12 to 17 were the "home-and-way reverse" of matches 1 to 6, and match 18 the "home-and-away reverse" of match 9.

Once the 18 round home-and-away season had finished, the 1926 VFL Premiers were determined by the specific format and conventions of the amended "Argus system".

Round 1

|- bgcolor="#CCCCFF"
| Home team
| Home team score
| Away team
| Away team score
| Venue
| Crowd
| Date
|- bgcolor="#FFFFFF"
| 
| 13.14 (92)
| 
| 8.15 (63)
| MCG
| 18,742
| 1 May 1926
|- bgcolor="#FFFFFF"
| 
| 15.14 (104)
| 
| 6.17 (53)
| Windy Hill
| 15,000
| 1 May 1926
|- bgcolor="#FFFFFF"
| 
| 11.11 (77)
| 
| 12.13 (85)
| Lake Oval
| 20,000
| 1 May 1926
|- bgcolor="#FFFFFF"
| 
| 13.15 (93)
| 
| 3.9 (27)
| Corio Oval
| 15,000
| 1 May 1926
|- bgcolor="#FFFFFF"
| 
| 7.13 (55)
| 
| 14.10 (94)
| Brunswick Street Oval
| 25,000
| 1 May 1926
|- bgcolor="#FFFFFF"
| 
| 6.14 (50)
| 
| 9.16 (70)
| Glenferrie Oval
| 16,000
| 1 May 1926

Round 2

|- bgcolor="#CCCCFF"
| Home team
| Home team score
| Away team
| Away team score
| Venue
| Crowd
| Date
|- bgcolor="#FFFFFF"
| 
| 8.9 (57)
| 
| 13.12 (90)
| Western Oval
| 15,000
| 8 May 1926
|- bgcolor="#FFFFFF"
| 
| 6.11 (47)
| 
| 10.18 (78)
| Victoria Park
| 25,000
| 8 May 1926
|- bgcolor="#FFFFFF"
| 
| 9.15 (69)
| 
| 8.10 (58)
| Princes Park
| 18,000
| 8 May 1926
|- bgcolor="#FFFFFF"
| 
| 5.8 (38)
| 
| 5.12 (42)
| Arden Street Oval
| 7,000
| 8 May 1926
|- bgcolor="#FFFFFF"
| 
| 15.15 (105)
| 
| 16.14 (110)
| Junction Oval
| 20,000
| 8 May 1926
|- bgcolor="#FFFFFF"
| 
| 18.8 (116)
| 
| 8.10 (58)
| Punt Road Oval
| 22,000
| 8 May 1926

Round 3

|- bgcolor="#CCCCFF"
| Home team
| Home team score
| Away team
| Away team score
| Venue
| Crowd
| Date
|- bgcolor="#FFFFFF"
| 
| 17.17 (119)
| 
| 14.5 (89)
| MCG
| 9,495
| 15 May 1926
|- bgcolor="#FFFFFF"
| 
| 11.13 (79)
| 
| 11.12 (78)
| Brunswick Street Oval
| 15,000
| 15 May 1926
|- bgcolor="#FFFFFF"
| 
| 10.9 (69)
| 
| 8.13 (61)
| Windy Hill
| 30,000
| 15 May 1926
|- bgcolor="#FFFFFF"
| 
| 6.11 (47)
| 
| 6.14 (50)
| Lake Oval
| 23,000
| 15 May 1926
|- bgcolor="#FFFFFF"
| 
| 6.11 (47)
| 
| 17.17 (119)
| Glenferrie Oval
| 13,000
| 15 May 1926
|- bgcolor="#FFFFFF"
| 
| 9.10 (64)
| 
| 8.12 (60)
| Corio Oval
| 18,000
| 15 May 1926

Round 4

|- bgcolor="#CCCCFF"
| Home team
| Home team score
| Away team
| Away team score
| Venue
| Crowd
| Date
|- bgcolor="#FFFFFF"
| 
| 12.12 (84)
| 
| 12.7 (79)
| Victoria Park
| 15,000
| 22 May 1926
|- bgcolor="#FFFFFF"
| 
| 10.11 (71)
| 
| 9.12 (66)
| Princes Park
| 25,000
| 22 May 1926
|- bgcolor="#FFFFFF"
| 
| 16.16 (112)
| 
| 14.16 (100)
| Punt Road Oval
| 14,000
| 22 May 1926
|- bgcolor="#FFFFFF"
| 
| 7.8 (50)
| 
| 7.16 (58)
| Arden Street Oval
| 14,000
| 22 May 1926
|- bgcolor="#FFFFFF"
| 
| 9.8 (62)
| 
| 7.9 (51)
| Junction Oval
| 22,000
| 22 May 1926
|- bgcolor="#FFFFFF"
| 
| 7.5 (47)
| 
| 6.13 (49)
| Western Oval
| 20,000
| 22 May 1926

Round 5

|- bgcolor="#CCCCFF"
| Home team
| Home team score
| Away team
| Away team score
| Venue
| Crowd
| Date
|- bgcolor="#FFFFFF"
| 
| 19.8 (122)
| 
| 12.17 (89)
| MCG
| 28,628
| 29 May 1926
|- bgcolor="#FFFFFF"
| 
| 13.7 (85)
| 
| 5.8 (38)
| Windy Hill
| 20,000
| 29 May 1926
|- bgcolor="#FFFFFF"
| 
| 10.15 (75)
| 
| 11.7 (73)
| Lake Oval
| 15,000
| 29 May 1926
|- bgcolor="#FFFFFF"
| 
| 9.13 (67)
| 
| 14.16 (100)
| Glenferrie Oval
| 10,000
| 29 May 1926
|- bgcolor="#FFFFFF"
| 
| 9.14 (68)
| 
| 10.15 (75)
| Corio Oval
| 19,500
| 29 May 1926
|- bgcolor="#FFFFFF"
| 
| 7.16 (58)
| 
| 7.6 (48)
| Brunswick Street Oval
| 25,000
| 29 May 1926

Round 6

|- bgcolor="#CCCCFF"
| Home team
| Home team score
| Away team
| Away team score
| Venue
| Crowd
| Date
|- bgcolor="#FFFFFF"
| 
| 6.10 (46)
| 
| 15.15 (105)
| Western Oval
| 16,000
| 5 June 1926
|- bgcolor="#FFFFFF"
| 
| 12.16 (88)
| 
| 8.11 (59)
| Victoria Park
| 16,000
| 5 June 1926
|- bgcolor="#FFFFFF"
| 
| 10.13 (73)
| 
| 6.15 (51)
| Princes Park
| 30,000
| 5 June 1926
|- bgcolor="#FFFFFF"
| 
| 12.7 (79)
| 
| 6.14 (50)
| Junction Oval
| 10,000
| 5 June 1926
|- bgcolor="#FFFFFF"
| 
| 10.13 (73)
| 
| 12.11 (83)
| Punt Road Oval
| 26,000
| 5 June 1926
|- bgcolor="#FFFFFF"
| 
| 11.11 (77)
| 
| 11.15 (81)
| Arden Street Oval
| 10,000
| 5 June 1926

Round 7

|- bgcolor="#CCCCFF"
| Home team
| Home team score
| Away team
| Away team score
| Venue
| Crowd
| Date
|- bgcolor="#FFFFFF"
| 
| 10.13 (73)
| 
| 10.14 (74)
| Arden Street Oval
| 12,000
| 7 June 1926
|- bgcolor="#FFFFFF"
| 
| 12.16 (88)
| 
| 8.17 (65)
| MCG
| 20,974
| 7 June 1926
|- bgcolor="#FFFFFF"
| 
| 11.15 (81)
| 
| 14.12 (96)
| Brunswick Street Oval
| 8,000
| 7 June 1926
|- bgcolor="#FFFFFF"
| 
| 13.11 (89)
| 
| 7.9 (51)
| Corio Oval
| 25,600
| 7 June 1926
|- bgcolor="#FFFFFF"
| 
| 9.12 (66)
| 
| 10.16 (76)
| Junction Oval
| 24,000
| 7 June 1926
|- bgcolor="#FFFFFF"
| 
| 10.11 (71)
| 
| 14.9 (93)
| Western Oval
| 20,000
| 7 June 1926

Round 8

|- bgcolor="#CCCCFF"
| Home team
| Home team score
| Away team
| Away team score
| Venue
| Crowd
| Date
|- bgcolor="#FFFFFF"
| 
| 11.19 (85)
| 
| 9.12 (66)
| Punt Road Oval
| 22,000
| 19 June 1926
|- bgcolor="#FFFFFF"
| 
| 10.9 (69)
| 
| 11.9 (75)
| Windy Hill
| 23,000
| 19 June 1926
|- bgcolor="#FFFFFF"
| 
| 28.16 (184)
| 
| 8.10 (58)
| Victoria Park
| 14,000
| 19 June 1926
|- bgcolor="#FFFFFF"
| 
| 17.7 (109)
| 
| 7.10 (52)
| Princes Park
| 20,000
| 19 June 1926
|- bgcolor="#FFFFFF"
| 
| 10.12 (72)
| 
| 18.10 (118)
| Glenferrie Oval
| 9,000
| 19 June 1926
|- bgcolor="#FFFFFF"
| 
| 13.15 (93)
| 
| 9.5 (59)
| Lake Oval
| 15,000
| 19 June 1926

Round 9

|- bgcolor="#CCCCFF"
| Home team
| Home team score
| Away team
| Away team score
| Venue
| Crowd
| Date
|- bgcolor="#FFFFFF"
| 
| 4.9 (33)
| 
| 5.17 (47)
| Arden Street Oval
| 5,000
| 26 June 1926
|- bgcolor="#FFFFFF"
| 
| 8.8 (56)
| 
| 9.13 (67)
| Western Oval
| 14,000
| 26 June 1926
|- bgcolor="#FFFFFF"
| 
| 10.9 (69)
| 
| 12.12 (84)
| Brunswick Street Oval
| 12,000
| 26 June 1926
|- bgcolor="#FFFFFF"
| 
| 10.10 (70)
| 
| 6.13 (49)
| Princes Park
| 30,000
| 26 June 1926
|- bgcolor="#FFFFFF"
| 
| 21.28 (154)
| 
| 1.7 (13)
| MCG
| 7,514
| 26 June 1926
|- bgcolor="#FFFFFF"
| 
| 9.15 (69)
| 
| 8.9 (57)
| Lake Oval
| 18,000
| 26 June 1926

Round 10

|- bgcolor="#CCCCFF"
| Home team
| Home team score
| Away team
| Away team score
| Venue
| Crowd
| Date
|- bgcolor="#FFFFFF"
| 
| 8.10 (58)
| 
| 11.16 (82)
| Glenferrie Oval
| 10,000
| 3 July 1926
|- bgcolor="#FFFFFF"
| 
| 8.19 (67)
| 
| 8.5 (53)
| Corio Oval
| 21,500
| 3 July 1926
|- bgcolor="#FFFFFF"
| 
| 7.17 (59)
| 
| 10.7 (67)
| Junction Oval
| 12,500
| 3 July 1926
|- bgcolor="#FFFFFF"
| 
| 6.13 (49)
| 
| 11.12 (78)
| Brunswick Street Oval
| 13,000
| 3 July 1926
|- bgcolor="#FFFFFF"
| 
| 8.5 (53)
| 
| 10.16 (76)
| Arden Street Oval
| 5,000
| 3 July 1926
|- bgcolor="#FFFFFF"
| 
| 7.17 (59)
| 
| 8.6 (54)
| Punt Road Oval
| 32,000
| 3 July 1926

Round 11

|- bgcolor="#CCCCFF"
| Home team
| Home team score
| Away team
| Away team score
| Venue
| Crowd
| Date
|- bgcolor="#FFFFFF"
| 
| 14.9 (93)
| 
| 10.8 (68)
| Western Oval
| 12,000
| 10 July 1926
|- bgcolor="#FFFFFF"
| 
| 11.8 (74)
| 
| 7.5 (47)
| Windy Hill
| 10,000
| 10 July 1926
|- bgcolor="#FFFFFF"
| 
| 14.15 (99)
| 
| 5.11 (41)
| Victoria Park
| 23,000
| 10 July 1926
|- bgcolor="#FFFFFF"
| 
| 11.14 (80)
| 
| 9.9 (63)
| Princes Park
| 15,000
| 10 July 1926
|- bgcolor="#FFFFFF"
| 
| 9.13 (67)
| 
| 8.8 (56)
| Lake Oval
| 20,000
| 10 July 1926
|- bgcolor="#FFFFFF"
| 
| 14.15 (99)
| 
| 8.12 (60)
| MCG
| 11,651
| 10 July 1926

Round 12

|- bgcolor="#CCCCFF"
| Home team
| Home team score
| Away team
| Away team score
| Venue
| Crowd
| Date
|- bgcolor="#FFFFFF"
| 
| 10.15 (75)
| 
| 16.12 (108)
| Punt Road Oval
| 27,000
| 17 July 1926
|- bgcolor="#FFFFFF"
| 
| 7.14 (56)
| 
| 15.17 (107)
| Western Oval
| 17,000
| 17 July 1926
|- bgcolor="#FFFFFF"
| 
| 18.16 (124)
| 
| 11.16 (82)
| Victoria Park
| 16,000
| 17 July 1926
|- bgcolor="#FFFFFF"
| 
| 8.17 (65)
| 
| 8.9 (57)
| Princes Park
| 12,000
| 17 July 1926
|- bgcolor="#FFFFFF"
| 
| 3.11 (29)
| 
| 17.16 (118)
| Junction Oval
| 14,000
| 17 July 1926
|- bgcolor="#FFFFFF"
| 
| 4.8 (32)
| 
| 6.14 (50)
| Arden Street Oval
| 10,000
| 17 July 1926

Round 13

|- bgcolor="#CCCCFF"
| Home team
| Home team score
| Away team
| Away team score
| Venue
| Crowd
| Date
|- bgcolor="#FFFFFF"
| 
| 10.10 (70)
| 
| 10.10 (70)
| Glenferrie Oval
| 4,500
| 7 August 1926
|- bgcolor="#FFFFFF"
| 
| 12.18 (90)
| 
| 5.8 (38)
| Corio Oval
| 10,500
| 7 August 1926
|- bgcolor="#FFFFFF"
| 
| 10.17 (77)
| 
| 12.20 (92)
| Brunswick Street Oval
| 10,000
| 7 August 1926
|- bgcolor="#FFFFFF"
| 
| 15.17 (107)
| 
| 6.12 (48)
| Lake Oval
| 14,000
| 7 August 1926
|- bgcolor="#FFFFFF"
| 
| 6.10 (46)
| 
| 10.9 (69)
| Windy Hill
| 20,000
| 7 August 1926
|- bgcolor="#FFFFFF"
| 
| 12.18 (90)
| 
| 8.10 (58)
| MCG
| 27,785
| 7 August 1926

Round 14

|- bgcolor="#CCCCFF"
| Home team
| Home team score
| Away team
| Away team score
| Venue
| Crowd
| Date
|- bgcolor="#FFFFFF"
| 
| 7.11 (53)
| 
| 10.21 (81)
| Junction Oval
| 15,000
| 14 August 1926
|- bgcolor="#FFFFFF"
| 
| 16.8 (104)
| 
| 3.10 (28)
| Victoria Park
| 7,000
| 14 August 1926
|- bgcolor="#FFFFFF"
| 
| 12.10 (82)
| 
| 10.15 (75)
| Princes Park
| 25,000
| 14 August 1926
|- bgcolor="#FFFFFF"
| 
| 10.7 (67)
| 
| 9.16 (70)
| Arden Street Oval
| 6,000
| 14 August 1926
|- bgcolor="#FFFFFF"
| 
| 8.15 (63)
| 
| 14.21 (105)
| Western Oval
| 10,000
| 14 August 1926
|- bgcolor="#FFFFFF"
| 
| 8.14 (62)
| 
| 10.7 (67)
| Punt Road Oval
| 20,000
| 14 August 1926

Round 15

|- bgcolor="#CCCCFF"
| Home team
| Home team score
| Away team
| Away team score
| Venue
| Crowd
| Date
|- bgcolor="#FFFFFF"
| 
| 10.9 (69)
| 
| 14.18 (102)
| Glenferrie Oval
| 5,000
| 21 August 1926
|- bgcolor="#FFFFFF"
| 
| 15.22 (112)
| 
| 7.6 (48)
| Corio Oval
| 10,000
| 21 August 1926
|- bgcolor="#FFFFFF"
| 
| 18.18 (126)
| 
| 9.10 (64)
| Brunswick Street Oval
| 7,000
| 21 August 1926
|- bgcolor="#FFFFFF"
| 
| 18.15 (123)
| 
| 9.9 (63)
| Windy Hill
| 8,000
| 21 August 1926
|- bgcolor="#FFFFFF"
| 
| 6.7 (43)
| 
| 13.15 (93)
| MCG
| 32,475
| 21 August 1926
|- bgcolor="#FFFFFF"
| 
| 12.13 (85)
| 
| 9.8 (62)
| Lake Oval
| 29,000
| 21 August 1926

Round 16

|- bgcolor="#CCCCFF"
| Home team
| Home team score
| Away team
| Away team score
| Venue
| Crowd
| Date
|- bgcolor="#FFFFFF"
| 
| 9.16 (70)
| 
| 15.16 (106)
| Arden Street Oval
| 12,000
| 28 August 1926
|- bgcolor="#FFFFFF"
| 
| 9.19 (73)
| 
| 11.14 (80)
| Western Oval
| 5,000
| 28 August 1926
|- bgcolor="#FFFFFF"
| 
| 8.16 (64)
| 
| 14.13 (97)
| Victoria Park
| 26,550
| 28 August 1926
|- bgcolor="#FFFFFF"
| 
| 18.18 (126)
| 
| 15.14 (104)
| Princes Park
| 25,000
| 28 August 1926
|- bgcolor="#FFFFFF"
| 
| 10.8 (68)
| 
| 13.16 (94)
| Punt Road Oval
| 15,000
| 28 August 1926
|- bgcolor="#FFFFFF"
| 
| 2.11 (23)
| 
| 14.11 (95)
| Junction Oval
| 13,000
| 28 August 1926

Round 17

|- bgcolor="#CCCCFF"
| Home team
| Home team score
| Away team
| Away team score
| Venue
| Crowd
| Date
|- bgcolor="#FFFFFF"
| 
| 10.10 (70)
| 
| 12.14 (86)
| Glenferrie Oval
| 5,000
| 4 September 1926
|- bgcolor="#FFFFFF"
| 
| 19.16 (130)
| 
| 8.18 (66)
| Corio Oval
| 11,500
| 4 September 1926
|- bgcolor="#FFFFFF"
| 
| 17.18 (120)
| 
| 13.7 (85)
| Brunswick Street Oval
| 6,000
| 4 September 1926
|- bgcolor="#FFFFFF"
| 
| 20.20 (140)
| 
| 9.14 (68)
| MCG
| 6,684
| 4 September 1926
|- bgcolor="#FFFFFF"
| 
| 8.9 (57)
| 
| 9.9 (63)
| Lake Oval
| 32,000
| 4 September 1926
|- bgcolor="#FFFFFF"
| 
| 13.8 (86)
| 
| 11.11 (77)
| Windy Hill
| 25,000
| 4 September 1926

Round 18

|- bgcolor="#CCCCFF"
| Home team
| Home team score
| Away team
| Away team score
| Venue
| Crowd
| Date
|- bgcolor="#FFFFFF"
| 
| 11.12 (78)
| 
| 18.13 (121)
| Glenferrie Oval
| 5,000
| 11 September 1926
|- bgcolor="#FFFFFF"
| 
| 9.17 (71)
| 
| 10.14 (74)
| Windy Hill
| 25,000
| 11 September 1926
|- bgcolor="#FFFFFF"
| 
| 13.12 (90)
| 
| 11.5 (71)
| Junction Oval
| 6,000
| 11 September 1926
|- bgcolor="#FFFFFF"
| 
| 6.13 (49)
| 
| 13.15 (93)
| Punt Road Oval
| 5,000
| 11 September 1926
|- bgcolor="#FFFFFF"
| 
| 15.14 (104)
| 
| 6.13 (49)
| Corio Oval
| 14,000
| 11 September 1926
|- bgcolor="#FFFFFF"
| 
| 12.24 (96)
| 
| 7.5 (47)
| Victoria Park
| 20,000
| 11 September 1926

Ladder

Finals

All of the 1926 finals were played at the MCG so the home team in the semi-finals and preliminary final is purely the higher ranked team from the ladder but in the Grand Final the home team was the team that won the preliminary final.

Semi-finals

|- bgcolor="#CCCCFF"
| Home team
| Score
| Away team
| Score
| Venue
| Crowd
| Date
|- bgcolor="#FFFFFF"
| 
| 10.10 (70)
| 
| 17.15 (117)
| MCG
| 50,662
| 18 September
|- bgcolor="#FFFFFF"
| Collingwood
| 12.12 (84)
| 
| 13.17 (95)
| MCG
| 44,286
| 25 September

Preliminary final

|- bgcolor="#CCCCFF"
| Home team
| Score
| Away team
| Score
| Venue
| Crowd
| Date
|- bgcolor="#FFFFFF"
| 
| 6.6 (42)
| 
| 5.9 (39)
| MCG
| 50,162
| 2 October

Grand final

Melbourne defeated Collingwood 17.17 (119) to 9.8 (62), in front of a crowd of 59,362 people. (For an explanation of scoring see Australian rules football).

Awards
 The 1926 VFL Premiership team was Melbourne.
 The VFL's leading goalkicker was Gordon Coventry of Collingwood with 83 goals; a VFL record.
 The winner of the 1926 Brownlow Medal was Ivor Warne-Smith of Melbourne with 9 votes.
 North Melbourne took the "wooden spoon" in 1926.
Carlton 14.11 (95) defeated  5.13 (43) in the challenge Grand Final, played as a curtain raiser to the firsts Grand Final on 9 October at the Melbourne Cricket Ground.

Notable events
 In order to ensure that each team had nine home games in every season, the 17 game home-and-away season of 1925 was extended to 18 matches in 1926.
 Following the retirement due to ill-health of Sir Baldwin Spencer, former Melbourne footballer, club doctor, and VFL delegate Dr. William C. McClelland became President of the VFL. He served from 1926 to 1956.
 Halfway through the 1924 season, Carlton's champion Horrie Clover retired as a player due to a serious illness. He was subsequently appointed Secretary of the Carlton Club and, as well, he was made a member of the VFL's Umpire and permit Committee. By the start of 1926, Clover's health had improved to the extent that he resumed his career with Carlton, playing another 78 senior games from 1926 to 1931. Due to the perceived conflict of interest, he was made to resign from the VFL Committee.
 As the players were walking off the field for their half-time break in the preliminary final, the Melbourne centreman Bob Corbett was viciously king-hit from behind, suffering a broken jaw; Essendon's Charlie May was subsequently suspended for all of 1927 for the incident. With no replacements allowed, Melbourne were forced to continue with 17 men and were gamely defending against the Essendon onslaught in the last quarter when, with only minutes to go in the match, a barely conscious Corbett staggered out onto the field with his head swathed in bandages, and took up his position in the centre, freeing up Ivor Warne-Smith to lead the Melbourne attack. In a mark of respect for Corbett's great courage, Essendon tough-man and rugged full-back Harry Hunter, who was racing up the ground towards the Essendon goals, saw a battered Corbett standing in his way. Under normal circumstances, Hunter, who was known to take no prisoners, would have run straight through Corbett; however, in what was described as an act of great chivalry by a sportsman and a gentleman, Hunter sidestepped Corbett, and delivered the ball down the ground through another avenue. Melbourne won 6.6 (42) to Essendon's 5.9 (39). The king-hit led to strong calls for substitute replacement players.

Footnotes

References
 Maplestone, M., Flying Higher: History of the Essendon Football Club 1872–1996, Essendon Football Club, (Melbourne), 1996. 
 Rogers, S. & Brown, A., Every Game Ever Played: VFL/AFL Results 1897–1997 (Sixth Edition), Viking Books, (Ringwood), 1998. 
 Ross, J. (ed), 100 Years of Australian Football 1897–1996: The Complete Story of the AFL, All the Big Stories, All the Great Pictures, All the Champions, Every AFL Season Reported, Viking, (Ringwood), 1996.

External links
 1926 Season – AFL Tables

Australian Football League seasons
VFL